James Lay (born 16 December 1993) is a Samoa rugby union player. His usual position is as a Prop, and he recently played for the Bristol Bears in England.

Career 
Lay was born in Samoa, but moved to New Zealand with his parents at age two and attended school in Auckland.

On 23 August 2019, he was named in Samoa's 34-man training squad for the 2019 Rugby World Cup, before being named in the final 31 on 31 August.

References

External links
itsrugby.co.uk Profile

1993 births
Living people
Samoan rugby union players
Samoa international rugby union players
Samoan emigrants to New Zealand
Rugby union props
Auckland rugby union players
Bay of Plenty rugby union players
Bristol Bears players
Blues (Super Rugby) players